What Now is a New Zealand children's TV program.

What Now may also refer to:

 What, Now? (album), 2001 album by Peter Hammill
 What Now? (album), 2005 album by Kenny Wheeler
 What Now (Sylvan Esso album)
 What Now (song), 2012 song by Rihanna
 "What Now" 1963 song and single by Adam Faith
 "What Now" 1964 song by Gene Chandler	
 "What Now" 1967 song by Tommy McCook
 "What Now" 1966 song by Tony Barber, B-side to "Wait By The Water"
 What Now (film), a 2015 film